Daniel Yuan Hao Au Yeong (born 10 February 2003) is an Austrian footballer who plays as a winger or forward for Austria Wien II.

Career

Club career

In 2019, Au Yeong joined the youth academy of German Bundesliga side Freiburg. In 2022, he signed for Austria Wien II in Austria. On 12 August 2022, he debuted for Austria Wien II during a 2–3 loss to Admira.

International career

Au Yeong is eligible to represent Singapore internationally through his father.

Personal life

Au Yeong was born in the Netherlands to the former Singapore international footballer Au-yeong Pak Kuan and an Austrian mother. His sister is an Austrian badminton player, Serena Au Yeong.

References

External links
 

2003 births
Living people
Footballers from Eindhoven
Austrian footballers
Austria youth international footballers
Dutch footballers
Austrian people of Singaporean descent
Dutch people of Austrian descent
Dutch people of Singaporean descent
Association football forwards
Association football wingers
2. Liga (Austria) players
Austrian expatriate footballers
Austrian expatriate sportspeople in Germany
Expatriate footballers in Germany